The Marrakech Marathon is an annual marathon held in Marrakech, Morocco. Roughly 5000 runners turn out for the event annually.

At the inaugural edition of the race in 1987 French runner Jacques Boxberger won the men's race while the women's race was won by a Moroccan 14-year-old Nadia Colombero – whose win made her one of the youngest ever winners of an international level marathon.

Past winners
Key:

References

List of winners
Marrakech Marathon. Association of Road Racing Statisticians. Retrieved on 2013-04-13.

Bibliography

External links
Official website

Sports competitions in Marrakesh
Marathons in Morocco
Recurring sporting events established in 1987
1987 establishments in Morocco